Yash Kumarr, (born 12 February 1985) is an Indian actor and producer, who works primarily in Bhojpuri language films, mainly in lead roles. He has also worked as lead in several south Indian and Bollywood films.

Career
Yash Kumarr started his career in the television serial Agle Janam Mohe Bitiya Hi Kijo 2010 and Taarak Mehta Ka Ooltah Chashmah 2012.

In 2013 he made his film acting debut in the Bhojpuri movie ‘Dildar Sanwariya’ directed by Vishal Verma and his performance was praised by critics and audiences.

Filmography

References

External links
 

Living people
1985 births
Male actors in Bhojpuri cinema
Male actors from Bihar
Indian male film actors